Rebelote is the second studio album by the French rock band Matmatah. In this album, Matmatah largely abandoned Celtic rock and references to their hometown of Brittany in favor of traditional rock music. The album sold over 200,000 copies.

Track listing
Boeing Down	2:36
Quelques sourires	3:30
Archimède	4:24
Petite mort	4:29
Sushi Bar	2:32
The Grave Digger	3:42
Y'a de la place	3:06
Tricard Twins	3:57
Crève les yeux	4:05
Abonné absent	3:55
Out	9:09

Personnel

 Tristan Nihouarn - guitar, vocals
 Éric Digaire - bass, vocals
 Cédric Floc'h - guitar, vocals
 Jean-François Paillard - drums
 Jesus Presley - production
 DJ Pone - featured on "Abonné absent" and "Quelques sourires"

(Track listing acquired from Amazon.com's listings  and )

2001 albums
Matmatah albums